Miltzow is an Amt in the district of Vorpommern-Rügen, in Mecklenburg-Vorpommern, Germany. The seat of the Amt is in Miltzow, a village in the municipality Sundhagen.

The Amt Miltzow consists of the following municipalities:
Elmenhorst
Sundhagen
Wittenhagen

Ämter in Mecklenburg-Western Pomerania